Pedro Miguel Gonçalves Lópes (born 29 June 1975) is a Portuguese former professional road cyclist. He competed in the men's individual road race at the 1996 Summer Olympics. He also competed in the 2000 Vuelta a España.

Major results

1995
 2nd Overall GP Costa Azul
1st Stage 2
1998
 1st Stage 2 Volta a Portugal
 3rd Road race, National Road Championships
 8th Overall Giro di Puglia
2001
 3rd Time trial, National Road Championships
 8th Overall Volta ao Alentejo
2002
 1st Stage 5 Vuelta Asturias
 1st Stage 1 Troféu Joaquim Agostinho
2004
 2nd Overall 
 6th Overall Volta ao Algarve
 9th Klasika Primavera
2005
 4th Overall Volta ao Algarve
2006
 4th Overall GP Costa Azul
2009
 7th Overall Tour du Maroc

References

External links

1975 births
Living people
Portuguese male cyclists
Olympic cyclists of Portugal
Cyclists at the 1996 Summer Olympics